The Madison Mallards are a collegiate summer baseball team based in Madison, Wisconsin that plays in the Northwoods League. Warner Park on Madison’s Northside is the team's home field.

History
The history of minor league baseball in Madison begins with the early success of the Madison Muskies. A Midwest League Oakland A's affiliate, the Muskies were competitive and gained a healthy following in the years following their 1982 origins. Unfortunately by 1993 the crowds had declined and the Muskies became less profitable.

In 1994 the Muskies were replaced for a single season by the St Louis affiliate, Madison Hatters. 1996 began the five-year stint of the independent Madison Black Wolf, but once again low attendance and little interest plagued the team and they were forced to move to a more profitable community.

In 2001, area businessman Steve Schmitt introduced the Madison Mallards to Warner Park. The Mallards joined the Northwoods League, which features amateur college players playing summer ball during their off-season.

On October 17, 2019, the pro shop had significant damage done to it by a suspicious fire and the police investigated it as arson. There was an estimated $150,000 in damages.

Success 
The Mallards made it to the playoffs in 2003, 2004, 2005, 2006, 2008, 2013, 2015, 2016, and 2021. They have made four Northwoods League Championship Series appearances, which resulted in runner-up finishes in 2005 and 2008. They won the Northwoods League championship in 2004 and 2013.

Ownership 
In 2014, the Mallards ownership group created Big Top Baseball. Big Top Baseball was a leader in summer collegiate baseball, operating four Northwoods League franchises in the state of Wisconsin at the time. Big Top Baseball owns and operates the Madison Mallards and Kenosha Kingfish and formerly owned the Wisconsin Rapids Rafters and Green Bay Bullfrogs, which were sold off during the COVID-19 pandemic.

Stadium
Warner Park, built in 1982, currently seats 6,750 people.

Dimensions 
The playing surface of the field is mainly grass, and the dimensions from home plate are 308 1/3 feet to left field, 380 feet to center field, and 290 2/3 feet to right field. The 440-square-foot scoreboard, installed in 2013, is located in left-center field. 14 flat-screen televisions can be found throughout the stadium. There is a children's playground and picnic seating close to the foul lines in left field.

Attendance 
The Mallards routinely lead the nation in attendance among collegiate summer baseball teams, averaging over 6,308 fans per game in 2017 and 6,249 in 2018.

Duck Blind 
The club offers a promotion called the Duck Blind, a group of seats in right field that cost up to $41 and include unlimited food, soda, and beer. In 2018, the Duck Blind underwent a $1 million renovation.

Gallery

Notable MLB alumni
 Pete Alonso
 Nico Hoerner
 Jose Trevino (baseball)
 Alec Mills
 Matt Vierling
 Phil Gosselin
 Matt Thaiss
 Danny Burawa
 Derek Fisher
 J.R. Graham
 John Hicks
 Ryan Spilborghs

Notes

External links
 Madison Mallards – official website
 Northwoods League – official website
 Stadium Journey – Ballpark Review

Northwoods League teams
Sports in Madison, Wisconsin
Amateur baseball teams in Wisconsin
Baseball teams established in 2001
2001 establishments in Wisconsin